Lactuca inermis is a species of wild lettuce native to sub-Saharan Africa, Madagascar, and the Arabian peninsula. A pioneer species often found in disturbed areas, it is of variable height, from very short (5cm) to quite tall (240cm) and woody. Local people consume its young leaves, perhaps with a light boiling, as a salad green or vegetable.

Varieties
Two varieties are currently accepted:

Lactuca inermis var. inermis
Lactuca inermis var. myriocephala (Dethier) Lawalrée

References

inermis
Plants described in 1775